The Ford Maverick is a four-door, five-passenger, compact crew cab pickup truck manufactured and marketed by Ford Motor Company. It was unveiled on June 8, 2021 as Ford's smallest truck. 

Using a front-wheel drive-based unibody platform shared with the Ford Escape and Bronco Sport, the pickup's powertrain offerings include a standard full hybrid engine or an optional conventional turbo engine, the latter available with all-wheel drive.

The Maverick went on sale in late 2021 for the 2022 model year.

Background 

Ford announced plans to launch a compact pickup truck based on Ford's C2 platform used by the Ford Focus in January 2019, simultaneously with the appearance of the first pre-production prototypes. 

In July 2020, a tailgate photo leaked to the press, confirming the truck would use the Maverick, previously used on Ford's compact passenger car (1970–1979). Ford noted the name wasn't selected to recall the earlier passenger car, but was found to resonate with younger, active customers.

The Maverick is manufactured at Ford's Hermosillo Assembly in Mexico alongside the Bronco Sport for both the North and South American auto markets. Production began on September 2, 2021.

In January 2022, Ford suspended customer orders due to a backlog in vehicle production. The company told dealers it intended to resume taking orders for the 2023 model later in the year. The strong demand for the Maverick was said to indicate consumer support for a more affordable pickup truck.

Powertrain 
A hybrid engine with an e-CVT gearbox is standard equipment on all Maverick models. A 2.5-liter Duratec Atkinson cycle inline-four gasoline engine paired with an electric motor produces a combined  at 5600 rpm. The engine produces  of torque at 4000 rpm, and the hybrid system produces  of torque.

A 2.0-liter EcoBoost turbocharged four-cylinder gasoline engine is optional. Front-wheel drive is standard on all models, with all-wheel drive offered only with the EcoBoost engine.

The Maverick can tow  standard, with an optional upgrade to  when equipped with the optional EcoBoost engine, all-wheel drive, and 4K Tow Package option (which includes more robust cooling for the engine and transmission, a trailer brake controller and lower axle gear ratios). Also optional only on AWD models is an FX4 off-road package featuring additional traction control modes, hill descent control, skid plates, tow hooks and all-terrain tires.

On August 1, 2022, Ford announced a new Tremor package for 2023 Maverick AWD models at the XLT and Lariat trim levels, adding significant off-road capability to the Maverick. The package includes a twin-clutch rear drive unit with a differential lock feature taken from the Bronco Sport Badlands that can divert rear-axle torque to either wheel. It also includes a redesigned front fascia to improve the approach angle, upgraded suspension components, and a factory lift to increase ground clearance by 1" over other Maverick models, in addition to off-road features from the existing FX4 package.

All Maverick models use a rotary gear selector knob located on the center console.

Trim levels 

The Maverick is available in three trim levels with the same designations as all Ford trucks: base (XL), mid-level (XLT), and top-tier (Lariat).

Front-wheel drive is standard on all models, and all-wheel-drive is an available option on the 2.0L EcoBoost gasoline engine, itself an extra-cost option.

Standard equipment on all trim levels includes a touchscreen infotainment system with wired Apple CarPlay and Android Auto smartphone integration and 4G LTE capability, a rear-view camera, pre-collision assist with automatic emergency braking, power windows and door locks, remote keyless entry, auto-on headlamps and auto high-beams, a multifunction steering wheel, and air conditioning. Options available on all models include a power/tilt moonroof and the Ford CoPilot360 suite of driver assistance technologies.

The base (XL) trim comes with silver-painted steel wheels, black exterior trim, a six-speaker audio system, and cloth seating surfaces. Notably, cruise control and power mirrors were not available as options on the 2022 base (XL) model.  Cruise became a standard feature for 2023

The mid-level (XLT) trim adds features to the base trim, including cruise control, power mirrors, aluminum-alloy wheels, color-keyed exterior trim, higher-grade cloth seating and interior trim, a larger (4.2") full-color LCD instrument cluster display, and remote start. An optional package adds heated and power-adjustable seats, a leather-wrapped steering wheel and other features to the mid-level trim.

The top-tier (Lariat) trim adds features to the mid-level trim, including ActiveX faux leather-trimmed seating surfaces and leather-wrapped steering wheel, heated front bucket seats, powered seat adjustments, push-button ignition, a powered sliding rear window and others. Optional features available as part of the luxury package only on the top-tier trim level include adaptive cruise control, a Bang & Olufsen premium amplified audio system, and SiriusXM satellite radio.

A First Edition Package was available at launch based on the top-tier trim with options, including the 2.0L EcoBoost engine and eight-speed automatic transmission. It featured unique aluminum-alloy wheels and painted exterior trim. It was only available for a limited number of units in the 2022 model year.

Safety
The Maverick has ventilated disc brakes on all wheels.

IIHS 
The 2022 Maverick was tested by the IIHS:

NHTSA 
The 2022 Maverick was tested by the National Highway Traffic Safety Administration and received 4 out of 5 stars overall.

Sales

References

External links

 

Maverick (2022)
Pickup trucks
Sport utility trucks
Cars introduced in 2021
Front-wheel-drive vehicles
All-wheel-drive vehicles
Hybrid electric vehicles
Vehicles with CVT transmission